Marc Christopher Munford (born February 14, 1965) is a former American football linebacker who played four seasons with the Denver Broncos of the National Football League (NFL). He was drafted by the Broncos in the fourth round of the 1987 NFL Draft. He played college football at the University of Nebraska–Lincoln and attended Heritage High School in Littleton, Colorado. Munford was also a member of the Kansas City Chiefs for the 1991 season. He was inducted into the Nebraska Football Hall of Fame in 1997.

References

External links
Just Sports Stats

Living people
1965 births
Players of American football from Nebraska
American football linebackers
Nebraska Cornhuskers football players
Denver Broncos players
Sportspeople from Lincoln, Nebraska